Gladys Campbell (February 1892 – July 1, 1992) was a poet and teacher in Chicago. As a student she was an early member of the University of Chicago Poetry Club.

Life
Campbell attended the University of Chicago to study poetry and earned a Bachelor of Arts in 1920 and a Master of Arts in 1943. Campbell was one of the early members of the University of Chicago Poetry Club. Campbell was close friends with George Dillon, Charles Bell, and Glenway Wescott.

Campbell wrote poetry throughout her life and her poems appeared frequently in Poetry magazine, The Forge, The Dial and Book Notes.

Campbell taught English and humanities in Chicago from 1922 to 1957. Hyde Park's Poetry Society met in her apartment.

Publications
The Momentary Beach (1972)

References

Further reading
"Some Recollections of the Poetry Club at the University of Chicago," Poetry Magazine, Volume 105, October 1964, Page 50.

External links 
Gladys Campbell Papers. Yale Collection of American Literature, Beinecke Rare Book and Manuscript Library.

1892 births
1992 deaths
20th-century American poets
American women poets
University of Chicago alumni
20th-century American women writers